Normans Bay railway station serves Normans Bay in East Sussex. It is on the East Coastway Line, and train services are provided by Southern.

The station was opened on 11 September 1905 and was originally named Pevensey Sluice, but later that year it was renamed Normans Bay Halt. The name was altered to Normans Bay on 5 May 1969.

According to a text held by a local resident, the station was built in Victorian times due to the arrival of a stranded whale in the nearby marshes, although these are now much further out to sea. On hearing the news of the whale, several Londoners  flocked to the south coast and found no railway station, instead having to jump several feet from the train. The local public house – The Star Inn (still in use today) – urged the local authorities to place a halt, so several sleepers were hurried in overnight.

A level crossing named 'Havensmouth' by Network Rail is in operation at Normans Bay, which was upgraded to automatic full length barriers in February 2015 in co-operation with the upgrading of part of the East Coastway Line.

A self-service ticket machine was installed at the station in 2016.

Services 

All services at Normans Bay are operated by Southern using Class 377 EMUs and Class 171 DMUs. 

The typical off-peak service in trains per hour is:

 1 tph to 
 1 tph to  via 

On Sundays, there is an hourly service between London Victoria and Ore. This service was introduced in May 2018 as Normans Bay was not served on Sundays before this. The platforms are only long enough for 3 coaches.

References

External links 

 Southern E Group website for Normans Bay Railway Station

Railway stations in East Sussex
DfT Category F2 stations
Former London, Brighton and South Coast Railway stations
Railway stations in Great Britain opened in 1905
Railway stations served by Govia Thameslink Railway
Bexhill-on-Sea